The 1st constituency of Lot-et-Garonne (French: Première circonscription de Lot-et-Garonne) is a French legislative constituency in the Lot-et-Garonne département. Like the other 576 French constituencies, it elects one MP using a two round electoral system.

Description
The 1st Constituency of Lot-et-Garonne lies in the south of the département around the small city of Agen on the Garonne river. Politically the seat had swung between the centre-right Union for French Democracy and the Socialist Party, this changed in 2017 when, along with the other two seats in Lot-et-Garonne it fell to En Marche.

Assembly members

Election results

2022

 
 
 
 
 
 
 
 
 
 

 
 
 
 
 

* Withdrew before the 2nd round

2017

 
 
 
 
 
 
 
 
|-
| colspan="8" bgcolor="#E9E9E9"|
|-

2012

 
 
 
 
 
 
 
 
|-
| colspan="8" bgcolor="#E9E9E9"|
|-

References

1